Lupinus fulcratus, the greenstipule lupine, is a species of flowering plant from the order of Lamiales which is native to Nevada and California, where it is found in Sequoia and Kings Canyon National Parks.

References

fulcratus
Flora of California
Flora of Nevada
Flora without expected TNC conservation status